Cho Kyung-ja is a former international table tennis player from South Korea.

Table tennis career
She won a silver medal at the 1959 World Table Tennis Championships, in the Corbillon Cup (women's team event) for South Korea with Lee Chong-Hi, Choi Kyung-ja and Hwang Yool-ja.  

She reached a world ranking of 10 in 1961.

See also
 List of World Table Tennis Championships medalists

References

South Korean female table tennis players
Year of birth missing (living people)
Asian Games medalists in table tennis
Table tennis players at the 1958 Asian Games
Medalists at the 1958 Asian Games
Asian Games silver medalists for South Korea
Asian Games bronze medalists for South Korea
World Table Tennis Championships medalists
Possibly living people